"Alive" is a song by S Club, released as a single on 18 November 2002. Called a "power-packed dancefloor thriller" in the Best inlay booklet, the track features strong disco beats and samples. "Alive" was the first single to be released under the S Club name rather than S Club 7, and it was also the first single to be released without Paul Cattermole. "Alive" was the penultimate S Club single and apart from the double A-side "Say Goodbye"/"Love Ain't Gonna Wait for You", was the only track to be released from the fourth album, Seeing Double. It reached number five on the UK Singles Chart. The B-side, "Discotek" was led and co-written by Tina Barrett. The song also served as the main theme for Viva S Club, the band's final TV series.

Changes
There were several changes made to the Seeing Double album following Jo O'Meara's debilitating back condition, which meant she had to take time out of the heavy promo campaigns and gruelling schedules and dance routines. On "Alive", "Love Ain't Gonna Wait for You" and "Dance", the band re-recorded O'Meara's lead vocals to be performed by Rachel Stevens during live promotions. The release was originally planned to have CD1 with O'Meara, and CD2 with Stevens, but, the idea was later scrapped in favour of O'Meara's vocals. The song was the poorest charting and selling S Club single in the band's history, peaking at #5 in the UK. Another note of interest regarding "Alive" was revealed on CD:UKs behind the scenes footage of the making of the video where Bradley McIntosh revealed that the original version of the song showcased Paul Cattermole on lead vocals rather than himself.

Music video
The video for "Alive", shot in Los Angeles, California, shows the group dancing in the "S" Club. "Alive" is the only music video from S Club not to feature previous band member Paul Cattermole. In Seeing Double, Cattermole can be seen during the shots of the band playing live. In the music videos for "Say Goodbye" and "Love Ain't Gonna Wait for You", Cattermole can be seen in replays of the band's previous videos and behind-the-scenes archive footage. It was directed by Nigel Dick.

Track listing
 UK CD1 "Alive" (Radio version)
 "Dance" (Radio version)
 "Alive" (Almighty mix)
 "Alive" (CD-ROM video)

 UK CD2 "Alive" (Radio version)
 "Discotek"
 "Dance" (Harry's Afro Hut Wonky remix)

 Cassette'
 "Alive" (Radio version)
 "Dance" (Radio version)
 "Alive" (Almighty mix)

Charts

Weekly charts

Year-end charts

References

S Club 7 songs
2002 singles
2002 songs
Music television series theme songs
Music videos directed by Nigel Dick
Song recordings produced by Simon Ellis (record producer)
Songs written by Sheppard Solomon
Songs written by Simon Ellis (record producer)